London Falling is a strip published in June-July 2006 in the British comics magazine 2000 AD, created by writer Simon Spurrier and artist Lee Garbett. It explores bogeymen from English folklore and mythology wreaking havoc in a modern-day setting.

The title is a play on The Clash's 1979 album London Calling.

Characters

The characters all draw heavily on mythology, especially the folklore from north west Europe. They include:

 Jack Capelthwaite is a family man just getting on with his life but his old life is going to catch up with him as Capelthwaite is a shapeshifting monster, a bogeyman.
 Black Shuck is the leader of the gang and his name comes from the East Anglian version of the black dog
 Hedley Kow, a form of Elf or Hobgoblin , shown in the story as a shapeshifting monster
 Jenny Greenteeth
 Peter Struwwel, a character from a 19th-century German children's picture book authored by Heinrich Hoffman
 The Tailor, a bogeyman from The Story of Little Suck-a-Thumb from the same book
 Tommy Rawhead is an Irish hobgoblin with a taste for children
 Black Annis
 Cailleach Bheur
 Dando the Huntsman, a Cornish priest connected with ideas of the Wild Hunt 
 Bucco-Boo, a kind of Bogeyman (presumably the name coming via bugaboo)
 Mujina is a Japanese bogeyman, that can take on the form seen in the series, a faceless ghost
 Horndon Worm was a dragon from East Horndon who was killed by James Tyrrell (who also appears in the series) using mirror polished armour

Appearances 

Each episode of London Falling is given an individual title:
Part 1: City Folk (in 2000AD #1491)
Part 2: Loredogs (in 2000AD #1492)
Part 3: Let Me Take You By The Hand (in 2000AD #1493)
Part 4: That Go Bump (in 2000AD #1494)
Part 5: Smoke and Mirrors (in 2000AD #1495)

See also
English folklore

External links
2000 AD profile
Discussion on the mythology in the series

British comics
English folklore
European folklore
2000 AD comic strips